Kayabükü can refer to the following villages in Turkey:

 Kayabükü, Beypazarı
 Kayabükü, Gündoğmuş
 Kayabükü, Mengen
 Kayabükü, Pınarbaşı